Kingsbarns distillery is a Scotch whisky distillery located in Kingsbarns, Fife in the Lowlands whisky region in Scotland.

The distillery was founded in 2014 by Douglas Clement and is owned by Wemyss malts  with a capacity to produce 200,000 litres of spirit per year.

History 
Douglas Clement, formerly a golf caddie, was inspired to open a distillery near to the famous golf courses in the St Andrews and Kingsbarns area after visiting golfers expressed frustration at the lack of a nearby distillery.  After he got £670,000 grant from the Scottish Government he was able to convince the Wemyss family to invest £2.5 to £3m.

The Kingsbarns distillery officially opened on November 2014, with the first casks filled in 2015.

In August 2018, Kingsbarns distillery unveiled its first single malt Scotch whisky.

In November, the distillery launched "Balcomie" a single malt sherry cask whisky.

In November 2022, the Wemyss company announce expansion plans of the distillery with the construction of twelve bonded warehouses for whisky maturation and a bottling plant.

In December 2022, the distillery announce plans to enter the United States market.

References 

Distilleries in Scotland
Scottish malt whisky
2014 establishments in Scotland